Boronia keysii, commonly known as Keys boronia,  is a flowering plant that is endemic to Queensland in Australia. It is a sprawling shrub with thin stems, hairy young shoots, pinnate leaves and pink, four-petalled flowers over a long period.

Description
The young stems are covered with brownish, star-shaped hairs. The leaves are arranged in opposite pairs and lack a petiole. There are eight stamens with the four nearest the sepals slightly long than the four near the petals. Flowering occurs throughout the year but mostly from May to November.

Taxonomy and namingBoronia keysii was first formally described in 1926 by Karel Domin from specimens collected by James Keys at Lake Cootharaba in 1909. The description was published in the journal Bibliotheca Botanica published in Stuttgart under the heading Beitrage zur Flora und Pflanzengeographie Australiens (Contributions to the Flora and Plant Geography of Australia). The specific epithet (keysii) honours the collector of the type specimen.

Distribution and habitat
Key's boronia is usually found in the ecotone between forest and heath and commonly as an understorey species in open forest. It is only known from the Cooloola region near Lake Cootharaba.

ConservationBoronia keysii'' is listed as "vulnerable" under the Australian Government Environment Protection and Biodiversity Conservation Act 1999 and the Queensland Government Nature Conservation Act 1992. The main threats to the species include changes to the water table, inappropriate fire regimes and invasion by exotic pines from nearby plantations.

References

External links

keysii
Flora of Queensland
Plants described in 1926
Taxa named by Karel Domin